Mount Tapulao (also known as High Peak) is the highest mountain in the Zambales Mountain Range and in the province of Zambales in the Philippines. Its name is derived from the abundance of Sumatran Pine trees in the area, known in Zambal as tapolaw.

The mountain was once a site of a large-scale chromite mining operations. The destruction of the beautiful natural scenery is visible in the mine pits on the summit as well as other related structures along the trail. The summit offers a 360-degree vista from where you can see the other Zambales mountains on the eastern side, Lingayen Gulf to the north, and on the western side, the Zambales lowlands and the South China Sea stretching to as far south as Pundaquit in San Antonio, Zambales.

Hiking activity
The trail to the top of Mount Tapulao is on rolling and gradual terrain that takes hikers through a number of distinct ecosystems: from lowland grass and scrubland dominated by talahib (cogon grass) to its flanks of secondary to primary dipterocarp forest, mossy montane forest and pine forest above  that extends to the adjacent mountains.

During wet weather, limatik or forest leeches abound especially near the streams along the way. Parts of the trail become rivulets that trekkers easily attracts these critters without noticing being bitten, sticking on the human skin.

From Palauig
The jump-off point is from the Dampay resettlement area in Brgy. From the trailhead at Brgy. Residents of Dampay are evacuees from the foot of Mount Pinatubo and are the "self-appointed guardians" of Mt. Tapulao under the coordination of the Municipal Tourism Authority of Palauig, Zambales.

The ascent can be done in 7–8 hours while the descent can be covered in half the time. Guests and tourists aiming to climb the mountain are required to register at the barangay hall to receive further safety, security and cooperation according to the rule and guidance of the tourism authority. Farther down the settlement is a trail leading to the jump off-point for the Bagsit River whitewater river rafting.

Traverse hike
A traverse hike is also possible starting from the eastern side of the Mount Tapulao in Brgy. Labney in the town of Mayantoc in Tarlac province, ending in Palauig, or vice versa. The trail from the northwest is longer and a much more challenging route than the one from Zambales, but the reward is a more diverse environment and fauna.

Ecosystem
 Department of Environment and Natural Resources (DENR) region 3 has signed a memorandum of agreement for the protection and development of  Mt. Tapulao.
 Sangguniang Bayan (SB) of Iba, Zambales came out with an ordinance declaring the town's part of Mt. Tapulao as an eco-tourism destination and a protected area.

See also
 List of mountains in the Philippines
 List of Southeast Asian mountains
 Geography of the Philippines

References

External links
 New Rodent Species Discovered on Philippine Mountain
 25 Highest Mountains in the Philippines
 Philippines Mountain Ultra-Prominence

Tapulao
Landforms of Zambales
Tourist attractions in Zambales